In the United States and other nations that use jury trials (such as Australia), a judicial override is when a judge overrules a jury's sentencing determination.

Use in capital cases 
Only four U.S. states have allowed judicial overrides: Alabama, Delaware, Florida, and Indiana. Indiana abolished it in 2002, Florida in 2016, and Alabama in 2017. In 2016, the Delaware Supreme Court declared the state's death penalty law unconstitutional due to the override.

Researchers who analyzed survey data from thousands of capital jurors found that "residual doubt" about the person's guilt was the most significant reason jurors voted for a life sentence instead of the death penalty. This could suggest that life-to-death overrides have a higher likelihood of resulting in a wrongful conviction.

Florida 
Florida was the first state to adopt an override statute in the 1970s, after the Supreme Court case Furman v. Georgia had effectively invalidated all death penalty statutes in the country. The purpose of the override was to prevent juries from over-sentencing the death penalty. In Tedder v. State (1975), the Supreme Court of Florida stated that for a judge to override a jury's recommendation of a life sentence, "the facts suggesting a sentence of death should be so clear and convincing that virtually no reasonable person could differ." The U.S. Supreme Court upheld Florida's statute in 1984. The last death sentence imposed by override in the state was in 1999.

In January 2016, the U.S. Supreme Court struck down a part of Florida's capital sentencing scheme in Hurst v. Florida. The Court held that "The Sixth Amendment requires a jury, not a judge, to find each fact necessary to impose a sentence of death. A jury’s mere recommendation is not enough." In March 2016, the state legislature abolished the judicial override.

Indiana 
Indiana followed Florida in 1977 and enacted a similar death penalty scheme in which the jury's sentence recommendation was not binding. There were no directions on when the judge could override the jury's life sentence until 1989, when the Indiana Supreme Court held that the override was permitted only when "virtually no reasonable person could disagree that death was appropriate." All ten death sentences imposed by override in Indiana were later vacated in appellate courts. In 2002, the override was abolished, and the courts were left with an option to determine the sentence only when the jury's recommendation was not unanimous.

Alabama
In Alabama, judges had no restrictions on when they could override a jury's recommendation of a life sentence. Judicial overrides amounted to more than 20 percent of all death sentences between 1981 and 2015 (101 out of 413), and half of exonerations due to innocence (3 out of 6).
 
In 1995, the United States Supreme Court held in an 8–1 decision that the Eighth Amendment "does not require the State to define the weight the sentencing judge must give to an advisory jury verdict." The Court had been asked to impose Florida's "great weight" standard on Alabama, but Associate Justice Sandra Day O'Connor said that doing so would amount to micromanagement. The Supreme Court declined to take up a case reviewing Alabama's use of judicial overrides in 2013 and again in 2015. Justices Stephen Breyer and Sonia Sotomayor dissented the 2013 decision to decline to rehear the issue. Justice Sotomayor suggested that the elected nature of Alabama's judges is the underlying issue, with a study showing that death sentences are imposed more in election years.

In April 2017, the Alabama legislature passed a bill that abolished judicial override prospectively.

Delaware 
Delaware enacted an override statute in November 1991 after a jury had given four perpetrators life sentences for murdering two guards during an armed robbery. The life-to-death override was used on only one defendant, whose sentence was appealed and ultimately changed to a life verdict. Instead, the override was used multiple times to override a death sentence recommended by the jury.

In August 2016, the Delaware Supreme Court held that the judicial override made the state's death penalty statute violate the Sixth Amendment of the US Constitution.

See also 
 Capital punishment in Alabama
 Capital punishment in Florida
 Capital punishment in Delaware
 Capital punishment in Indiana
 Judgment notwithstanding verdict

References 

Capital punishment in the United States